The 1998–99 NBL season was the 21st season of competition since its establishment in 1979. A total of 11 teams contested the league. This season marked the first summer season for the NBL. The Townsville Suns were renamed the Townsville Crocodiles

Regular season
The 1998–99 regular season took place over 23 rounds between 9 October 1998 and 14 March 1999.

Round 1

|- bgcolor="#CCCCFF" font size=1
!width=90| Date
!width=180| Home
!width=60| Score
!width=180| Away
!width=260| Venue
!width=70| Crowd
!width=70| Boxscore

Round 2

|- bgcolor="#CCCCFF" font size=1
!width=90| Date
!width=180| Home
!width=60| Score
!width=180| Away
!width=260| Venue
!width=70| Crowd
!width=70| Boxscore

Round 3

|- bgcolor="#CCCCFF" font size=1
!width=90| Date
!width=180| Home
!width=60| Score
!width=180| Away
!width=260| Venue
!width=70| Crowd
!width=70| Boxscore

Round 4

|- bgcolor="#CCCCFF" font size=1
!width=90| Date
!width=180| Home
!width=60| Score
!width=180| Away
!width=260| Venue
!width=70| Crowd
!width=70| Boxscore

Round 5

|- bgcolor="#CCCCFF" font size=1
!width=90| Date
!width=180| Home
!width=60| Score
!width=180| Away
!width=260| Venue
!width=70| Crowd
!width=70| Boxscore

Round 6

|- bgcolor="#CCCCFF" font size=1
!width=90| Date
!width=180| Home
!width=60| Score
!width=180| Away
!width=260| Venue
!width=70| Crowd
!width=70| Boxscore

Round 7

|- bgcolor="#CCCCFF" font size=1
!width=90| Date
!width=180| Home
!width=60| Score
!width=180| Away
!width=260| Venue
!width=70| Crowd
!width=70| Boxscore

Round 8

|- bgcolor="#CCCCFF" font size=1
!width=90| Date
!width=180| Home
!width=60| Score
!width=180| Away
!width=260| Venue
!width=70| Crowd
!width=70| Boxscore

Round 9

|- bgcolor="#CCCCFF" font size=1
!width=90| Date
!width=180| Home
!width=60| Score
!width=180| Away
!width=260| Venue
!width=70| Crowd
!width=70| Boxscore

Round 10

|- bgcolor="#CCCCFF" font size=1
!width=90| Date
!width=180| Home
!width=60| Score
!width=180| Away
!width=260| Venue
!width=70| Crowd
!width=70| Boxscore

Round 11

|- bgcolor="#CCCCFF" font size=1
!width=90| Date
!width=180| Home
!width=60| Score
!width=180| Away
!width=260| Venue
!width=70| Crowd
!width=70| Boxscore

Round 12

|- bgcolor="#CCCCFF" font size=1
!width=90| Date
!width=180| Home
!width=60| Score
!width=180| Away
!width=260| Venue
!width=70| Crowd
!width=70| Boxscore

Round 13

|- bgcolor="#CCCCFF" font size=1
!width=90| Date
!width=180| Home
!width=60| Score
!width=180| Away
!width=260| Venue
!width=70| Crowd
!width=70| Boxscore

Round 14

|- bgcolor="#CCCCFF" font size=1
!width=90| Date
!width=180| Home
!width=60| Score
!width=180| Away
!width=260| Venue
!width=70| Crowd
!width=70| Boxscore

Round 15

|- bgcolor="#CCCCFF" font size=1
!width=90| Date
!width=180| Home
!width=60| Score
!width=180| Away
!width=260| Venue
!width=70| Crowd
!width=70| Boxscore

Round 16

|- bgcolor="#CCCCFF" font size=1
!width=90| Date
!width=180| Home
!width=60| Score
!width=180| Away
!width=260| Venue
!width=70| Crowd
!width=70| Boxscore

Round 17

|- bgcolor="#CCCCFF" font size=1
!width=90| Date
!width=180| Home
!width=60| Score
!width=180| Away
!width=260| Venue
!width=70| Crowd
!width=70| Boxscore

Round 18

|- bgcolor="#CCCCFF" font size=1
!width=90| Date
!width=180| Home
!width=60| Score
!width=180| Away
!width=260| Venue
!width=70| Crowd
!width=70| Boxscore

Round 19

|- bgcolor="#CCCCFF" font size=1
!width=90| Date
!width=180| Home
!width=60| Score
!width=180| Away
!width=260| Venue
!width=70| Crowd
!width=70| Boxscore

Round 20

|- bgcolor="#CCCCFF" font size=1
!width=90| Date
!width=180| Home
!width=60| Score
!width=180| Away
!width=260| Venue
!width=70| Crowd
!width=70| Boxscore

Round 21

|- bgcolor="#CCCCFF" font size=1
!width=90| Date
!width=180| Home
!width=60| Score
!width=180| Away
!width=260| Venue
!width=70| Crowd
!width=70| Boxscore

Round 22

|- bgcolor="#CCCCFF" font size=1
!width=90| Date
!width=180| Home
!width=60| Score
!width=180| Away
!width=260| Venue
!width=70| Crowd
!width=70| Boxscore

Round 23

|- bgcolor="#CCCCFF" font size=1
!width=90| Date
!width=180| Home
!width=60| Score
!width=180| Away
!width=260| Venue
!width=70| Crowd
!width=70| Boxscore

Ladder

The NBL tie-breaker system as outlined in the NBL Rules and Regulations states that in the case of an identical win–loss record, the results in games played between the teams will determine order of seeding.

1Wollongong Hawks won Head-to-Head (2-0). 

2Brisbane Bullets won Head-to-Head (2-1). 

3Townsville Crocodiles won Head-to-Head (2-1). 

4Sydney Kings won Head-to-Head (2-1).

Finals

Playoff bracket

Qualifying Finals

|- bgcolor="#CCCCFF" font size=1
!width=90| Date
!width=180| Home
!width=60| Score
!width=180| Away
!width=260| Venue
!width=70| Crowd
!width=70| Boxscore

Semi-finals

|- bgcolor="#CCCCFF" font size=1
!width=90| Date
!width=180| Home
!width=60| Score
!width=180| Away
!width=260| Venue
!width=70| Crowd
!width=70| Boxscore

Grand Final

|- bgcolor="#CCCCFF" font size=1
!width=90| Date
!width=180| Home
!width=60| Score
!width=180| Away
!width=260| Venue
!width=70| Crowd
!width=70| Boxscore

1998–99 NBL statistics leaders

NBL awards
Most Valuable Player: Steve Woodberry, Brisbane Bullets
Most Valuable Player Grand Final: Brett Maher, Adelaide 36ers
Rookie of the Year: Damien Ryan, Canberra Cannons
Best Defensive Player: Darnell Mee, Adelaide 36ers
Best Sixth Man: Bruce Bolden, West Sydney Razorbacks
Most Improved Player: C.J. Bruton, Wollongong Hawks
Coach of the Year: Lindsay Gaze, Melbourne Tigers & Brendan Joyce, Wollongong Hawks

All NBL Team

External links
NBL official website, including live scores and fixtures

 
NBL